NBLxNBA is a series involving clubs from the National Basketball League (NBL) of Australia and New Zealand and the National Basketball Association (NBA) of the United States and Canada. The series started in 2017 for each league's 2017–18 season, and each season includes between two and seven games. The games have previously always been held in United States of America and Canada, and typically are held during September and early October.

Seasons

2017–18 season
In 2017 the NBL announced that the Brisbane Bullets, Melbourne United and the Sydney Kings would compete in games against three NBA teams in the inaugural NBLxNBA series.

Despite losing all three games (including a one point thriller), the series was marked as a success for the NBL as it brought in much higher television ratings than the teams were used to, and it showed how competitive the league is. The series also drew the attention of multiple high profile NBA players, including Australian Ben Simmons who expressed his interest in competing in a future NBLxNBA game.

2018–19 season
The NBL announced a second series on 27 June 2018, with five of their eight clubs travelling to the United States of America to complete in seven games. The clubs which didn't complete were the Brisbane Bullets, Cairns Taipans and Illawarra Hawks.

The Adelaide 36ers reached the highest score by the NBL teams and fell one point short of the elusive 100 points milestone, but the NBL teams failed to record a victory for a second year in a row.

2019–20 season
On July 4, 2019 it was announced that the Adelaide 36ers, Melbourne United and the New Zealand Breakers would play the Utah Jazz, Memphis Grizzlies, Oklahoma City Thunder, Los Angeles Clippers and Sacramento Kings in the 2019 edition of NBLxNBA. The series was pushed closer towards the start of the NBA season, which meant the Adelaide 36ers and New Zealand Breakers missed the beginning of the NBL season, and Melbourne United missed a fortnight of the early rounds of the season.

Despite the NBL losing streak continuing, this series marked the first time an NBL team reached the 100 point mark against an NBA team. This happened in both Melbourne United games against the Los Angeles Clippers and Sacramento Kings.

2022–23 season
After a 3-year hiatus due to the COVID-19 pandemic, it was announced that the Adelaide 36ers would take on the Phoenix Suns and Oklahoma City Thunder in October 2022. The series saw the first NBL win over an NBA team, with the 36ers beating the Suns 134-124 in Arizona on 3 October 2022.

See also

 National Basketball League (Australia)
 National Basketball Association

References

External links
 Official NBL website

National Basketball Association
National Basketball League (Australia)
Recurring sporting events established in 2017
2017 establishments in Australia